Helka Hynninen (May 21, 1930 in Vesanto – May 29, 2017 in Mikkeli) was a Finnish singer and songwriter, who was also a farmer in Mikkeli. She was not nationally known before 1976, but in her home region, Vesanto, however, was known for decades as a good singer. In summer 1980, Hynninen's career took a new turn when she performed for Finnish-Americans  in Lake Worth, Florida. She performed in the United States dozens of times and appeared in Finland Society at the invitation the Atlanta Summer Olympics in 1996.

Hynninen's most popular song (Lapsuusajan maisemissa, in English Landscapes of childhood) was written in 1976.

Discography 
 Helka Hynninen Hiirolasta, (1976)
 Vanhan pirtin tarina, (1978)
 Hiljaisin hetkin, (1978)
 Tyttären valssi, (1981)
 Vain yhden elämän, (1984)
 Nuoruuden rakkaus, (1987)
 Askeleet kuun sillalla, (1997)
 Muistoja lapsuudenkodista, (1999)

References

20th-century Finnish women singers
1930 births
2017 deaths
People from Vesanto